The 2019–20 Cal Poly Mustangs men's basketball team represented California Polytechnic State University in the 2019–20 NCAA Division I men's basketball season. The Mustangs, led by first-year head coach John Smith, played their home games at the Mott Athletics Center in San Luis Obispo, California as members of the Big West Conference. They finished the season 7–23, 4–12 in Big West play to finish in last place. They failed to qualify for the Big West tournament (although the Big West tournament was ultimately cancelled due to the COVID-19 pandemic).

Previous season
The Mustangs finished the 2018–19 season 6–23 overall, 2–14 in Big West play to finish in ninth place. They failed to qualify for the Big West Conference tournament.

On March 6, 2019, it was announced that head coach Joe Callero would not be retained after his 10th season. He compiled a record of 126–184 while at Cal Poly. On March 27, it was announced that Cal State Fullerton associate head coach John Smith would be named the 11th head coach in program history.

Roster

Schedule and results

|-
!colspan=12 style=| Tour of London

|-
!colspan=12 style=| Non-conference regular season

|-
!colspan=9 style=| Big West regular season

|-

Source

References

Cal Poly Mustangs men's basketball seasons
Cal Poly Mustangs
Cal Poly Mustangs men's basketball
Cal Poly Mustangs men's basketball